The 2019 Bangamata U–19 Women's Gold Cup was the 1st edition of Bangamata U-19 Women's International Gold Cup, an annual international women's youth football tournament hosted by Bangladesh Football Federation.The main goal of this tournament to make strong pipeline of Bangladesh women's national football team in future. After the 4th edition of this tournament it will be National women's team tournament instead of Bangladesh women's national under-20 football team.

Draw
The draw was held at the Hotel Pan Pacific Sonargaon in Dhaka on 12 March 2019.The six teams were divided into two groups. The top two teams from each group qualified for the semi-finals.

Venue

Prize money
 Champion got US$25,000.
 Runners-up got US$15,000.

Participating teams 
 (Host)

Group stage
 Times listed are UTC+6:00.

Group A

Group B

Knockout stage
 Time Listed are UTC+6:00
 All matches were held at Dhaka 
 In the knockout stage, extra time and penalty shoot-out are used to decide the winner if necessary.

Bracket

Semi-finals

Final

Goalscorers

Broadcaster

Sponsorship
Local sports marketing company K-Sports bought the rights for the tournament.

Co-sponsored by
 United Commercial Bank Limited
 Dhaka Bank Limited
 Biman Bangladesh Airlines
 Haa-Meem Group
 Intraco Group
 Bangladesh Tourism Board
 Nagorik Tv
 Radio Bhumi
 Radio Foorti
 Unicef Bangladesh 
 Intercontinental Dhaka

References

Bangamata U-19 Women's International Gold Cup
2019 in Bangladeshi football
2019 in women's association football
Under-19 association football competitions
Bangamata U-19 Women's Gold Cup
Bangamata U-19 Women's Gold Cup
International association football competitions hosted by Bangladesh